Quiche is a French tart consisting of pastry crust filled with savoury custard and pieces of cheese, meat, seafood or vegetables. A well-known variant is quiche Lorraine, which includes lardons or bacon. Quiche may be served hot, warm or cold.

Overview

Etymology
The word is first attested in French in 1805, and in 1605 in  Lorrain patois.  The first English usage—"quiche Lorraine"—was recorded in 1925.  The further etymology is uncertain but it may be related to the German  meaning "cake" or "tart".

History

Quiche is considered a French dish; however, using eggs and cream in pastry was practised in English cuisine at least as early as the 14th century and Italian cuisine at least as early as the 13th century. Recipes for eggs and cream baked in pastry containing meat, fish and fruit are referred to Crustardes of flesh and Crustade in the 14th-century The Forme of Cury and in 15th-century cookbooks, such as the Italian .

Varieties
A quiche usually has a pastry crust and a filling of eggs and milk and/or cream. It may be made with vegetables, meat or seafood, and be served hot, warm or cold. Types of quiche include:

In her French Country Cooking (1951), Elizabeth David gives a recipe for a quiche aux pommes de terre, in which the case is made not from shortcrust but from mashed potato, flour and butter; the filling is cream, Gruyère and garlic.

Gallery

Notes

References

Sources

See also

 Pie
 Bacon and egg pie
 List of pies, tarts and flans

External links

Savoury pies
French cuisine
Egg dishes